Scopula permutata is a moth of the  family Geometridae. It is found in Mongolia, Russia and Tibet.

References

Moths described in 1897
permutata
Moths of Asia